Alpine skiing at the 1990 Asian Winter Games took place in the city of Sapporo, Japan from 10 to 13 March 1990 with four events contested — two each for men and women. Slalom events would later be substituted for Super Giant Slalom events in the next Winter Asiad but reinstated in the 1999 Winter Asian Games in South Korea.

Medalists

Men

Women

Medal table

References

 
1990 Asian Winter Games events
Asian Winter Games
1990